Ahalya in Hinduism is the wife of the sage Gautama Maharishi.

Ahalya may also refer to:

 Ahalya (TV series), a Tamil soap opera, 2004–2006
 Ahalya (1978 film), an Indian Malayalam film directed Babu Nanthankode
 Ahalya (2015 film), a Bengali short film directed by Sujoy Ghosh

See also 
 Ahilyabai Holkar